Potassium argentocyanide is an inorganic compound with the formula KAg(CN)2. A white solid, it is the K+ salt of the linear coordination complex [Ag(CN)2]-.  It forms upon treatment of virtually any silver salt with two equivalents of potassium cyanide.

Uses and reactions
KAg(CN)2 is significant adventitious product of gold mining using cyanide as an extractant.

It can be used in silver plating, as a bactericide, and in the manufacture of antiseptics.

It forms a variety of coordination polymers, a property that exploits the bridging tendency of the cyanide ligand.

References

Potassium compounds
Silver compounds
Cyano complexes